Illinois's 12th House of Representatives district is a Representative district within the Illinois House of Representatives located in Cook County, Illinois. It has been represented by Democrat Margaret Croke since January 2, 2021. The district was previously represented by Democrat Yoni Pizer for ten months in 2020.

The district includes parts of the Chicago neighborhoods of Lake View, Lincoln Park, and Near North Side.

Representative district history

List of representatives

1849 – 1855

1855 – 1861

1861 – 1873

1957 – 1973

1983 – Present

Historic District Boundaries

Electoral history

2030 – 2022

2020 – 2012

2010 – 2002

2000 – 1992

1990 – 1982

1970 – 1962

1960 – 1956

Notes

References

Illinois House of Representatives districts
Government of Chicago